William Ewart Tamplin (10 May 1917 – 20 October 1989) was a Welsh international rugby union lock who played club rugby for Cardiff. He won seven caps for Wales and captained his country in their victory over the 1947 touring Australian team.
 
Two of his brothers, Tom and Ewart, also played first class rugby but they never represented their country.

Rugby career
Tamplin first played club rugby for smaller second class clubs before joining Pontypool and then in 1939, Newport. Rugby was suspended for the duration of World War II and after the end of hostilities Tamplin joined Cardiff. Tamplin was selected to represent his country late in his rugby career when he was chosen to play, in the 1947 Five Nations Championship. Although missing the opening game against England, Tamplin was selected for the remaining three games of the tournament. His first cap was against Scotland, under the captaincy of Haydn Tanner. Wales enjoyed a high scoring victory, and Tamplin himself scored two conversions and a penalty goal. Tamplin also scored in the next two games of the Championship, with the winning penalty goal against France, and a conversion in the Irish match.

In December 1947 Tamplin was not only selected to play for Wales but would captain his country against the touring Australian in 1947. When Tamplin was selected to face Australia, he was still a Cardiff player, and as well as leading the Welsh team he also scored all the points in a victory over the Australians after two successful penalty kicks.

In the 1948 Five Nations Championship, Tamplin played in three games, drawing against England, beating Scotland, but most importantly, losing on home soil to France.  France were at the time the weakest team in the tournament, and had failed to win in Wales on nine successive occasions.  It would be Tamplin's final international game.

Tamplin also represented the invitational Barbarians.

International matches played
Wales
  1947
  1948
  1947, 1948
  1947
  1947, 1948

Bibliography

References 

1917 births
1989 deaths
Barbarian F.C. players
Cardiff RFC players
Newport RFC players
Pontypool RFC players
Rugby union locks
Rugby union players from Risca
Wales international rugby union players
Wales rugby union captains
Welsh rugby union players